Tolazamide is an oral blood glucose lowering drug used for people with Type 2 diabetes. It is part of the sulfonylurea family (ATC A10BB).

Synthesis

para-Toluenesulfonamide is converted to its carbamate with ethyl chloroformate in the presence of a base. Heating that intermediate with 1-amino-azepane leads to the displacement of the ethoxy group and the formation of tolazemide:

Azepane proper would lead to [13078-23-4].

References

External links 
 

Potassium channel blockers
Benzenesulfonylureas
Azepanes
p-Tosyl compounds